Viktoriya Bondar (born 25 September 1995) is a Ukrainian road and track cyclist, who currently rides for UCI Women's Continental Team . Representing Ukraine at international competitions, Bondar competed at the 2016 UEC European Track Championships in the scratch event.

Major results
2014
Grand Prix Galichyna
2nd Team sprint (with Valeriia Zalizna)
3rd Keirin
2016
3rd Points race, Grand Prix Galichyna
2017
Grand Prix Galichyna
1st Madison (with Ana Nahirna)
1st Omnium

References

External links

1995 births
Living people
Ukrainian female cyclists
Ukrainian track cyclists
Place of birth missing (living people)
21st-century Ukrainian women